Frontier School of the Bible is a small Bible Institute located in La Grange, Wyoming, United States.  It is a state approved, non-profit educational institution.

The school was founded by Rev. Richard LeBar and Rev. Dan Johnson on September 5, 1967.  It currently offers a residential college experience with a variety of Christian service opportunities. The current president is Nelson Miles and the vice president is Bill Bagley.

After gaining a minimum of 102 credits and three years of study, students are eligible for a non-accredited Associate of Arts degree.  Associate degree recipients may apply for a non-accredited Bachelor of Arts degree upon completion of an additional year of full-time ministry, language school, or an internship.

Doctrinally, the school endorses a literal approach to biblical hermeneutics resulting in dispensationalism, including adherence to pre-tribulationism and premillennialism.

References

External links
Frontier School of the Bible's website

Seminaries and theological colleges in Wyoming
Schools in Goshen County, Wyoming
Educational institutions established in 1967
Bible colleges